Ramsey Lewis' Newly Recorded All-Time Non-Stop Golden Hits (often shortened to Ramsey Lewis' Golden Hits) is an album by pianist Ramsey Lewis, recorded in 1973 and released on the Columbia label. The album contains remakes of Lewis' more successful Argo and Cadet recordings.

Reception

AllMusic called the album a "budget sampler of pop cuts".

Track listing
 "Hang on Sloopy" (Wes Farrell, Bert Russell) - 2:13    
 "Blues for the Night Owl" (Sonny Thompson) - 4:17    
 "Hi-Heel Sneakers" (Robert Higgenbotham) -  2:41    
 "Carmen" (Georges Bizet) - 6:51    
 "Song of Delilah" (Ray Evans, Jay Livingston, Victor Young) - 4:46    
 "Wade in the Water" (Traditional) - 2:46    
 "Slipping into Darkness" (Papa Dee Allen, Harold Brown, B.B. Dickerson, Lonnie Jordan, Charles Miller, Lee Oskar, Howard E. Scott) - 6:15    
 "Something You Got" (Chris Kenner) - 3:00    
 "The 'In' Crowd" (Billy Page) - 2:37

Personnel 
Ramsey Lewis - piano, electric piano
Cleveland Eaton - bass, electric bass
Morris Jennings  - drums, percussion

References 

1973 albums
Ramsey Lewis albums
Columbia Records albums